
Gmina Dąbrowice is a rural gmina (administrative district) in Kutno County, Łódź Voivodeship, in central Poland.

Villages
Gmina Dąbrowice contains the villages and settlements of Augustopol, Baby, Baby-Towarzystwo, Cieleburzyna, Dąbrowice, Działy, Dzięgost, Iwiny, Liliopol, Łojewka, Majdany, Mariopol, Ostrówki, Piotrowo, Rozopol, Witawa, Żakowiec and Zgórze.

Neighbouring gminas
Gmina Dąbrowice is bordered by the gminas of Chodecz, Chodów, Krośniewice, Nowe Ostrowy and Przedecz.

References
Polish official population figures 2006

Dabrowice
Kutno County